Nikos Pappas is a Greek economist and politician who served as the Minister of Digital Policy, Telecommunications and Media in Alexis Tsipras' second cabinet.
He represents the Athens B constituency in the Hellenic Parliament.

Early life and education

Pappas studied at the University of Strathclyde and completed his PhD there in 2013, having written his thesis on the topic of the macroeconomic impact of projected population changes in Greece. In 2015, the University of Strathclyde Students' Association awarded Pappas lifetime membership for doing "inspiring work" to "rebalance the economic injustices facing working people".

Pappas lived in Scotland until he was invited to Greece in February 2008 by Alexis Tsipras. He formerly worked at the Fraser of Allander Institute, part of the University of Strathclyde, as a researcher.

Political career

Pappas was a minister of the government  of Alexis Tsipras. They first met at a meeting of Synaspismos Youth when they were 19. He later became Tsipras' chief of staff. He was appointed as a Minister of State in the First Cabinet of Alexis Tsipras. On February 24, 2023, Pappas was convicted by a Special Tribunal to two years in prison for the crime of breach of duty relating to his handling of television broadcast licenses during his tenure as Minister of Communications in the government of Alexis Tsipras, 2015-2019.

References

Year of birth missing (living people)
Living people
Syriza politicians
Government ministers of Greece
Greek MPs 2015 (February–August)
Greek MPs 2015–2019
Politicians from Athens
Greek MPs 2019–2023